Nanshan Island, also known as Lawak Island (Mandarin), is the eighth largest natural island of the Spratly Islands, and the fourth largest of the Philippine-occupied islands (none of the Philippine-occupied islands have any significant amount of reclaimed land). The island is administered by the Philippines as a part of Kalayaan, Palawan.

Environment
This island is a bird sanctuary. Its surroundings are highly phosphatized such that superphosphate materials can be mined out on a small-scale basis. Near the fringes of the breakwaters (approx. 2 miles (3 km) from the island), intact hard coral reefs were observed to retain their natural environment and beautiful tropical fishes were seen colonizing these coral beds of varying colors. It is also covered with coconut trees, bushes and grass. It is 580 m long, on the edge of a submerged reef.

Philippine occupation
A handful of Philippine soldiers and their families are stationed on the island, which has been inhabited since 1968 when the Philippines occupied this island. There are only one to two structures in this island that serve as shelters for the soldiers. The soldiers are also the guard of nearby Flat Island which lies 6 miles (10 km) north-northeast of the island which is also occupied by the Philippines. The island has a helipad. 

The Philippine Coast Guard constructed 5 lighthouses in the area, and this includes one on Nanshan Island.

Lawak Island is claimed by the People's Republic of China, the Republic of China (Taiwan), and Vietnam.

See also
Kalayaan, Palawan
Philippines and the Spratly Islands
Spratly Islands dispute

References

External links

 Asia Maritime Transparency Initiative Island Tracker
 Google map of Nanshan Island

Islands of the Spratly Islands
Kalayaan, Palawan